Matías Campos may refer to:

 Matías Campos Toro  (born 1989), Chilean football left-back
 Matías Campos López (born 1991), Chilean football forward for Everton

See also
 Matias del Campo, Chilean architect